Sanam Teri Kasam is a 2009, Indian romantic drama film directed by Lawrence D'Souza and starring Saif Ali Khan, Pooja Bhatt, Atul Agnihotri and Sheeba Akashdeep. The film was released in 2009, although it was produced in 1994. A long legal battle delayed its release for the fifteen years, from 1994 to 2009. The film was previously titled Sambandh (Relationship) and Yeh Pyar Hi To Hai (Well, that's love).  The audio cassettes were released as Sambandh.

Cast
 Saif Ali Khan as Vijay Verma
 Atul Agnihotri as Gopal
 Pooja Bhatt as Seema Khanna
 Sheeba Akashdeep as Dr. Renu Mahinder Nath
 Vikas Anand as Ramdin Kaka
 Saeed Jaffrey as Vikram Verma
 Alok Nath as Khanna

Soundtrack

References

External links

2000s Hindi-language films
2009 films
Films scored by Nadeem–Shravan
Films set in 1994
Films directed by Lawrence D'Souza